Endangered plants of Europe, the list below contains plants that dwell in or migrate to any region in Europe and any nearby islands of the Atlantic Ocean. This includes plants that are found in the East Atlantic Ocean (Azores), Iceland, the Adriatic Sea, the Sea of Azov, the Black and Caspian Sea, Corsica, Cyprus, Palearctic, Russia, Eurasia, North African Coast, the Mediterranean Sea and islands located in the Mediterranean Sea, and the islands of Spain (Canary, Balearic). As of 2007, twenty-one percent of Europe's vascular plant species (flowering plants, conifers and ferns) are classified as threatened, according to the IUCN. 
The list below was compiled from data on the IUCN Red List of Endangered Species (IUCN) and "Earth's Endangered Creatures" (Online). The International Union for Conservation of Nature, identifies species in need of attention before approaching extinction and works to increase prevention of extinction. The list below includes vulnerable (VU), endangered (EN), critically endangered (CR), and recently extinct (EX) species.

Threatened plants of Europe and their locations

Conservation
Propragation has been conducted using in vitro techniques in facilities across the country. This method of conservation is used in parts of the world to preserve plants for as long as possible. In vitro propagation has allowed material
to be kept in in vitro gene banks, and this will expand with
deeper developments in cryopreservation technology.
An increasing number of botanic gardens now have in vitro facilities,
and information on techniques is distributed between these in
addition to cultures.

See also
Threatened mammals of Europe

References

.Europe

Endangered plants
Europe